Simon Gempeler (born 9 May 1986) is a Swiss curler. He was born in Frutigen. He won gold medal with the Swiss team at the 2013 European Curling Championships in Stavanger. He competed at the 2013 World Curling Championships, and at the 2014 Winter Olympics in Sochi.

References

External links

1986 births
Living people
Curlers at the 2014 Winter Olympics
Swiss male curlers
Olympic curlers of Switzerland
European curling champions
Sportspeople from the canton of Bern
21st-century Swiss people